The Global Peace Agency (GPA) is a fictional law enforcement organization in the . The organization first appeared in the series OMAC by Jack Kirby. GPA agents are nameless and faceless, using a "cosmetic spray to hide [their] features" because they supposedly "represent all nations".

The Global Peace Agency was brought into the DC Universe proper in Final Crisis #7 (March 2009).

History
The origins of the Global Peace Agency trace back to the alien psych-historian race known as the Visionaries, dedicated to preserving civilizations "preferably by indirect scientific means". One of the Visionaries, Professor Z, discovered that Earth was on the brink of self-destruction by its own human civilization, which would bring forth the calamity known as the Great Disaster, and he urged the Visionaries' Council of Science to intervene on Earth's behalf. The Council supported Z's research and formed the Global Peace Agency. Disguised as humans, the members of the Global Peace Agency operated on Earth and became a benevolent, though powerful, law enforcement cartel.

The Global Peace Agency helped Earth's scientific community, particularly Doctor Myron Forest, to develop the Brother Eye satellite system, and they also initiated the OMAC Project which transformed meek stockroom clerk Buddy Blank into a "One-Man Army Corps".

After the events of the Final Crisis, (specifically, Final Crisis Aftermath: Escape), they started gathering particularly dangerous technology, such as the Flash's Cosmic Treadmill, Professor Alpheus Hyatt's Time Pool, and the Miracle Machine. All of these were deposited in Electric City, an alien plane of reality that only intersects tangentially and in special occasions with the core DC Universe. They viewed this as removing the seeds of future Crises, and in this endeavor they recruited Nemesis (Tom Tresser) and Cameron Chase.

Known agents
 Renee Montoya
 Mister Bones
 Cameron Chase
 Buddy Blank
 Nemesis

In other media

Television
 The GPA appears in the Batman: The Brave and the Bold episode "When OMAC Attacks" with its leaders voiced by Dee Bradley Baker and Keone Young. Its leaders hire Batman to stop a Russian scientist with the help of their janitorial agent Buddy Blank who can be transformed into OMAC.
 While GPA is not present in Arrow, its character Myron Forest appears, in the episode "The Secret Origin of Felicity Smoak", portrayed by Matthew McLellan. He is a former MIT student and hacktivist who, along with his roommate Cooper Seldon and Seldon's girlfriend Felicity Smoak, created a computer super virus and wanted to use it what they perceived initially as a noble cause, but gave up after Seldon was arrested by FBI. Years later, he works as a head of IT company and is initially seen and interrogated by Arrow as a suspect behind cyber attack in Star City, but is later revealed to be his former roommate.

References

Characters created by Jack Kirby
Comics characters introduced in 1974